Diagonal intersection is a term used in mathematics, especially in set theory.

If  is an ordinal number and  

is defined to be 

That is, an ordinal  is in the diagonal intersection  if and only if it is contained in the first  members of the sequence. This is the same as 

avoid restricting the range of the intersection.

See also

 Club filter
 Club set
 Fodor's lemma

References

 Thomas Jech, Set Theory, The Third Millennium Edition, Springer-Verlag Berlin Heidelberg New York, 2003, page 92.
 Akihiro Kanamori, The Higher Infinite, Second Edition, Springer-Verlag Berlin Heidelberg, 2009, page 2.

Ordinal numbers
Set theory